Magnús Ketilsson (29 January 1732 – 18 July 1803), was an Icelandic publisher and author. He ran Hrappsey Press, an Icelandic publishing company focused on non-religious publications. He published Islandske Maaneds Tidender (1773–1776), a periodical in the Danish language. He had an influence on the development of Icelandic spelling and grammar. He has been described as a leader of the neo-classic enlightenment movement in Iceland.

He studied at the University of Copenhagen. He became sýslumaður (district commander) of Dalasýsla in 1754.

References

1732 births
1803 deaths
University of Copenhagen alumni
Icelandic publishers (people)
18th-century Icelandic people